Shamim Akhtar (born on 9 March 1954) is a Pakistani politician who was Minister Provincial Assembly (MPA) Punjab, Pakistan from 2013 to 2018.

Early life and education
She was born on 9 March 1954 in Lahore.
She completed matriculation level education.

References

Pakistan Muslim League (N) politicians
Punjab MPAs 2013–2018
21st-century Pakistani women politicians
1954 births
Living people